The regular season of the 2019–20 NBL season, the 42nd season of the National Basketball League (Australia) started on 3 October 2019 and finished on 16 February 2020. Nine teams participated, with the South East Melbourne Phoenix entering the league for their first season.

Games

Round 1

Round 2

Round 3

Round 4

Round 5

Round 6

Round 7

Round 8

Round 9

Round 10

Round 11

Round 12

Round 13

Round 14

Round 15

Round 16

Round 17

Round 18

Round 19

Round 20

Ladder

References

External links

 

regular season
2019–20 in Australian basketball